ASPN may refer to:

 A common abbreviation of Asporin
 American standard pitch notation, a method to specify musical pitch
 Arizona Sports Programming Network, now known as YurView Arizona